is a 1935 Japanese novella by Osamu Dazai. It was first published in the short-lived coterie journal  and has been described as a "major contribution" to the magazine. In 1936, the novella was included in Dazai's first book-length fiction collection The Final Years. The story shares a protagonist with Dazai's novel No Longer Human (1948), which it preceded by thirteen years.

Synopsis 

In late December, the day after a failed suicide pact, twenty-something artist Ōba Yōzō awakens at a seaside sanatorium for tuberculosis patients and finds his lover Sono did not survive. A young nurse named Mano, whose face is marked with a noticeable scar, is assigned to care for him. His friends Hida and Kosuge travel down to visit, spending the night in a neighboring room. Though they crack jokes and cause a stir at the hospital, they privately wonder if Yōzō is as well as he seems. 

The next day, Yōzō's older brother arrives from their hometown far in the north and chides him for the trouble he's caused their family. He insists that the friends stay with him on nearby Enoshima. Later that night, Kosuge comes back to the hospital stinking of alcohol. Mano tells Yōzō and Kosuge a ghost story about seeing a phantom crab while keeping vigil with a dead patient. When Kosuge notices similarities to the sanatorium, Mano backpedals and says the story was made-up. 

It snows the following day. Yōzō tries to sketch the ocean and is disappointed with the result. His friend Hida returns from speaking with the police with Yōzō's brother and announces that Yōzō is being charged with aiding suicide, although Sono's husband doesn’t seem committed to the case. To steer the situation, Yōzō's brother has given him ¥200 and got him to sign a letter absolving their family from further responsibility. 

On the fourth day, the sanatorium director gives Yōzō a clean bill of health and directs Mano to remove his bandages. The three friends take a walk along the shore, so that Yōzō can point out the cliff that he and Sono jumped from. 

That night, Mano keeps Yōzō awake, telling him about the origins of the scar on her face. Just before dawn, they put on warm clothes and set off on a hike up the hill behind the sanatorium, which overlooks the coast. Their hope is to catch a glimpse of Mt. Fuji, but from the hilltop, it is too cloudy to see.

Style 

The Flowers of Buffoonery is narrated in the third-person, but the narrator, a self-conscious writer, makes frequent first-person asides, breaking the fourth wall as he comments on the quality or believability of the novel he is writing. At times the unnamed writer calls the book a masterpiece, while at other times he grumbles and dismisses it as the work of a hack. Dazai is said to have adapted this metafictional technique from the work of French novelist André Gide.

The narrator of The Flowers of Buffoonery uses the masculine first-person pronoun  to refer to himself. In contrast, the unnamed narrator of the foreword and afterword to No Longer Human uses the gender-neutral personal pronoun , while the character named  Ōba Yōzō in that work refers to himself in his portion of the narrative using the reflexive pronoun .

Reception 

The style and tone of the book have elicited various reactions. Donald Keene, a translator of Dazai's novels No Longer Human and The Setting Sun, praises The Flowers of Buffoonery as the first work in which "Dazai's mordant humor was a well-established part of his style." Author and critic Takako Takahashi, who cites Dazai as an influence, has dismissed as "unmanly" and "gratuitous" the asides in which the writer-narrator bemoans the quality of the story he is writing. 

Others have applauded Dazai as a "violator of conventions," noting how the narrator of The Flowers of Buffoonery "intrudes in the novel and comments on the autobiographical plot, exposing the fact that it is fictional." It has been argued that this ironic handling of the story highlights "the complex and perhaps ridiculous nature of autobiographical fiction" and that "this playful self-mockery exonerates the often despairing tone of Dazai's works, while also making them more effective as autobiography"

The story has been described as a comment on the futility of taking one's own life, with some critics suggesting that Dazai's "focus on the comical, embarrassing, and grotesque aspects" of suicide make the prospect of killing oneself appear as "meaningless, bleak and absurd as life itself."

Translations 
The first translation, into Italian, was published in 1990 by Lolli Santini in the journal Il Giappone. A French version by Juliette Brunet and Yuko Brunet was included in their book-length translation of The Final Years in 1997. South Korean translator Roh Jae-myung published a Korean translation in a 2005 collection titled Woman's Duel, after a different Dazai story also included in the volume. A Chinese translation was published by Taiwanese translator Liu Tzu-Chien in 2017.

See also 
No Longer Human
The Final Years
''Fourth wall

References

External links 
Full text at Aozora Bunko (in Japanese)

1935 novels
20th-century Japanese novels
Novels by Osamu Dazai
Novels set in Japan
Tuberculosis
Japanese novellas
Fictional characters who break the fourth wall